William Willingham (born 1956) is an American writer and artist of comics, known for his work on the series Elementals and Fables.

Career
William Willingham was born in Fort Belvoir, Virginia. During his father's military career the family also lived in Alaska, California, and finally three years in Germany. Willingham got his start from the late 1970s to early 1980s as a staff artist for TSR, Inc., where he illustrated a number of their role-playing game products. He was the cover artist for the AD&D Player Character Record Sheets, Against the Giants, Secret of Bone Hill, the Gamma World book Legion of Gold, and provided the back cover for In the Dungeons of the Slave Lords. He was an interior artist on White Plume Mountain, Slave Pits of the Undercity, Ghost Tower of Inverness, Secret of the Slavers Stockade, Secret of Bone Hill, Palace of the Silver Princess, Isle of Dread, The Mansion of Mad Professor Ludlow, Food Fight, In the Dungeons of the Slave Lords, the original Fiend Folio, Descent into the Depths of the Earth, Assault on the Aerie of the Slave Lords, Against the Giants, Queen of the Spiders, Realms of Horror, and the second and third editions of the Top Secret role-playing game. He also wrote and illustrated a couple of 1982 adventures for the game Villains & Vigilantes for Fantasy Games Unlimited, Death Duel with the Destroyers and The Island of Doctor Apocalypse. Willingham also produced the alien race design artwork for the original Master of Orion video game.

He first gained attention for his 1980s comic book series Elementals published by Comico, which he both wrote and illustrated; this series featured the Destroyers characters from his Villains & Vigilantes adventures as guest-stars. He contributed stories to Green Lantern and started his own independent, black-and-white comic book series Coventry which lasted only 3 issues. He also produced the pornographic series Ironwood for Eros Comix.

In the late 1990s, Willingham produced the 13-issue Pantheon for Lone Star Press and wrote a pair of short novels about the modern adventures of the hero Beowulf, and a fantasy novel Down the Mysterly River published by the Austin, Texas writer's collective, Clockwork Storybook, of which Willingham was a founding member. In the early 2000s, he began writing for DC Comics, including the limited series Proposition Player, a pair of limited series about the Greek witch Thessaly from The Sandman, and the series Fables. In 2003, Fables won the Will Eisner Comic Industry awards for best serialized story and best new series.

He describes himself as "rabidly pro-Israel" and says that Fables "was intended from the beginning" as a metaphor for the Israeli–Palestinian conflict, although he argues that Fables is not "a political tract. It never will be, but at the same time, it's not going to shy away from the fact that there are characters who have real moral and ethical centers, and we're not going to apologize for it."

Willingham worked on the Robin series from 2004 to 2006, and established Shadowpact, a title spun off his Day of Vengeance limited series. He also wrote Jack of Fables, an ongoing spin-off of his Fables series, co-written by Lilah Sturges. At the 2007 Comic Con International, he announced that he would be writing Salvation Run, a mini-series about supervillains who are banished to an inhospitable prison planet. He handed over the writing to Sturges after two issues because of illness. He worked on DCU: Decisions, a four-issue mini-series that deals with Green Arrow's endorsement of a political candidate. Again with Sturges, he began writing the Vertigo series House of Mystery, and DC's Justice Society of America with issue #29.

In 2009, Willingham agreed to write for Angel by IDW Publishing, initiated a new storyline titled "Immortality for Dummies".

In late 2010 (with cover dates January–April 2011), Willingham wrote the four-issue mini-series Warriors Three for Marvel Comics, illustrated by Neil Edwards.

At 2013 New York Comic Con it was announced that Willingham would be writing a seven-part mini series for Dynamite Entertainment (with art by Sergio Fernandez Davila). The series is Legenderry: A Steampunk Adventure and includes some of Dynamite's licensed and public domain characters in a steampunk setting. The series was released in January 2014, and a collected edition was published in January 2015.

Works
The issues listed include those where writing credits are for at least one story included in the issue.

References

Sources

External links
 
 
 
 

1956 births
20th-century American artists
20th-century American writers
21st-century American artists
21st-century American writers
American comics artists
American comics writers
Artists from Virginia
Date of birth missing (living people)
Eisner Award winners for Best Writer
Fables (comics)
Fabulists
Inkpot Award winners
Living people
People from Fort Belvoir, Virginia
Role-playing game artists
Writers from Virginia